The Norman Wettenhall Foundation is an Australian environmental philanthropic foundation and a charitable trust with tax-deductible status.  It supports projects that enhance or maintain the vitality and diversity of the Australian natural living environment, with an emphasis on conserving Australia's native birds and their habitats.  It was founded in 1997 on the proceeds of the sale of the book collection of Dr Henry Norman Burgess Wettenhall AM (1915-2000), a paediatrician, art-lover, amateur ornithologist, environmentalist and philanthropist.

External links
Norman Wettenhall Foundation

Conservation and environmental foundations
Environmental organisations based in Australia
Nature conservation in Australia
1997 establishments in Australia